Ricardo Mendoza Fortaleza (born April 18, 1951 in Malate, Manila, Philippines) is a Filipino-Australian retired Olympic amateur boxer/amateur boxing coach and boxing instructor. He currently lives in Blacktown, Sydney, Australia.

Early career
Ricardo fought in the bantamweight division. He has won a gold medal in Tokyo, Japan in 1969 at the first Asian youth championships. He has won the only gold medal in Amateur Boxing for the Philippines in the 6th Asian Games in Bangkok and a silver medal finish in the 1971 Asian Boxing Championship in Tehran. Ricardo was Philippine National Games champion in 1969-1974 and Manila Golden Gloves champion in 1965-1967.

The Fortaleza brothers
Ricardo was one of the four famous Fortaleza brothers in the Philippines, they were all famous in the sport of boxing.  The four consisted of Ricardo "Ric", Reynaldo "Rey", Renato "Rene" and Rogelio "Roger". Although Ric was the most successful of the four, Rey, Rene and Roger were also successful boxers.

1972 Munich Olympics
Ricardo represented the Philippines at the 1972 Munich Olympics, losing to Mexico's Alfonso Zamora by a second-round knockout in the Round of 32.

Coaching
Fortaleza became the Philippines boxing team coach from 1976 to 1993. He led the Philippine team at the 1992 Olympic Games in Barcelona, the President's Cup in Jakarta, the King's Cup in Bangkok, the Southeast Asian Games in Singapore, the second World Boxing championships in Belgrade, the Asian Games in Bangkok, the Inter-Cup tournament in Schriesheim (Germany), the Acropolis Cup in Athens, and several other international tournaments.

Fortaleza also trained boxers from different parts of the world. He helped introduced the sport of Amateur Boxing in Oman, he was assigned at the Sultan Qaboos Sports Complex. He coached the Oman boxing team between 1986 and 1990, and led the team to the 1988 Olympic Games in Seoul, Korea.

Fortaleza acted as  boxing coach at Taipei College of Physical Education in Taiwan.

Australia 
Fortaleza migrated with his family to Australia in 2000. He volunteered at the Sydney Olympic games in boxing tournaments.

Championships and accomplishments
 Gold medal - 1st Asian Youth Amateur Boxing Tournament- Tokyo Japan
 Gold medal - 6th Asian Games - Bangkok Thailand
 Silver medal - 1971 Asian Boxing Champhionship - Tehran Iran
 Olympian - 1972 Munich Olympics
 Philippines' Amateur Boxer of the year - 1970, 1971 and 1972

Personal life
Ricardo Fortaleza is the father of Musician Eric Fortaleza.

References

1951 births
Living people
Boxers at the 1972 Summer Olympics
Olympic boxers of the Philippines
Bantamweight boxers
Boxing trainers
People from Malate, Manila
Sportspeople from Manila
Boxers from Sydney
Boxers from Metro Manila
Asian Games medalists in boxing
Boxers at the 1970 Asian Games
Australian male boxers
Asian Games gold medalists for the Philippines
Medalists at the 1970 Asian Games
Boxers at the 1974 Asian Games
Filipino male boxers
Southeast Asian Games medalists in boxing